Bunocephalus coracoideus, the guitarrito, is a species of banjo catfish found in the Amazon River basin.  It occurs in Bolivia, Brazil, Peru and Uruguay where it is found in ponds and creeks that contain a large quantity of plant debris.  Its diet varies, and may include organic debris from the bottom.

In the aquarium 
The species is quite popular in the aquarium trade. They are generally very peaceful, however it is a predatory to small fish, such as young fry.

Behavior 
This fish is largely nocturnal. It is a bottom-feeder, consuming debris and smaller fish. The guitarrito lays up to 4,000 eggs into sandy substrate.

References

Aspredinidae
Fish of South America
Fish of Bolivia
Fish of Brazil
Fish of Peru
Fish of Uruguay
Taxa named by Edward Drinker Cope
Fish described in 1874